St. Xavier's Higher Secondary School is a private Catholic primary and senior secondary school located in Bettiah, Bihar, India. The school was founded in 1998 and is run by the Society of Jesus. The school offers kindergarten through higher secondary curriculum.

History 

The Society of Jesus (S.J., SJ, or SI) is a male religious order within the Catholic Church. Jesuits have been active in the field of education throughout the world from the start. The Jesuits number over 16,000 and comprise the largest single religious order in the Catholic Church. Jesuit priests and brothers are engaged in ministries in 112 nations on six continents. Their work is focused on education and intellectual pursuits, mainly at the secondary and tertiary levels, as well as missionary work and ministry in human rights and social justice. These educational institutions engage roughly 1 lakh collaborators and educate approximately 18 lakh students.

In India the Jesuits are responsible for 95 high schools. Jesuit education is inspired by the life and teachings of Jesus Christ and based on the principles of pedagogy elaborated by St. Ignatius of Loyola, with an emphasis on humanism and the service of others.

Founded by the Society of Jesus in 1998, the school offers the Central Board of Secondary Education Secondary School Examination (Class X) and Senior Certificate Examination (Class XII). In 2021, Vartika Jha, a student of Class 12th topped the district in CBSE Board examination with a score of 98.8%.

Facilities and activities 
The school has laboratories for physics, chemistry, biology, computers, English language, and a library with more than 20,000 books. It uses its website to inform parents of such matters as attendance, homework, syllabus, examination schedule, and diary, and to provide a platform for feedback from parents. The school and campus are covered by television surveillance (CCTV). Athletic facilities include a two hundred meter athletic track, music rooms and medical room. Sponsored sports include football, basketball, volleyball, throwball, badminton, table tennis, cricket, and karate.

See also

 List of Jesuit schools
 List of schools in Bihar
 List of Christian schools in India
 List of schools named after Francis Xavier

References

Jesuit secondary schools in India
Educational institutions established in 1998
Jesuit primary schools in India
West Champaran district
High schools and secondary schools in Bihar
Christian schools in Bihar
1998 establishments in Bihar